Brian H. Greenspan, (born March 14, 1947 in Niagara Falls, Ontario) is a Canadian lawyer. He is one of the most prominent and respected defence lawyers in Canada.

Career 
Greenspan received his B.A. from the University of Toronto in 1968 and his LL.B. from Osgoode Hall Law School in 1971. He received his LL.M. from the London School of Economics in 1972. He was called to the Bar in 1974. He taught the Administration of Criminal Justice at Osgoode Hall Law School from 1977 to 1984 and was a special lecturer in Criminal Law at the Faculty of Law, University of Toronto Law School from 1984 to 1998.

Greenspan is a senior partner in the Toronto firm Greenspan, Humphrey, Weinstein. He is the brother of the late Edward Greenspan, also a well-known Canadian lawyer, and Rosann Greenspan, Executive Director of the Center for Law and Society (ret.) at the University of California, Berkeley . Greenspan is married to Marla Berger, and is the father of Jared and Jenna Greenspan and the grandfather of Lucy, Greta, Sam and Oliver.

Greenspan was President of the Criminal Lawyers' Association (Ontario) from 1989 to 1993 and was the founding Chair of the Canadian Council of Criminal Defence Lawyers from 1992 to 1996.
Greenspan is a Fellow of the American College of Trial Lawyers, a Fellow of the International Society of Barristers and Litigation Counsel of America. He was awarded the Douglas K. Laidlaw Medal for excellence in oral advocacy in 2002 and received the G. Arthur Martin Medal for contributions to criminal justice in Canada in 2010. In 2012, he was recognized by the Law Society of Upper Canada with an honorary Doctor of Laws degree. In 2013, he was awarded the Alumni Gold Key for Achievement by Osgoode Hall; received the "Key to the City" of his hometown, Niagara Falls, Ontario; and was selected as an "Alumni of Influence" by University College of the University of Toronto. In 2020, Greenspan was honoured by the Toronto Lawyers Association with the Award of Distinction, was the Milvain Chair in Advocacy at the University of Calgary Faculty of Law and received Chambers Canada's Lifetime Achievement Award. Greenspan is a member of the Board of Directors of Innocence Canada.
Greenspan has been recognized in The International Who's Who of Business Crime Lawyers and The Best Lawyers in Canada since their inception and is a Band 1 leading individual in White Collar Crime in Chambers Canada. He has been named three times  as one of the 25 Most Influential Lawyers in Canada by Canadian Lawyer Magazine.

Notable clients 
Greenspan's clients include:
  
Alan Eagleson, Hockey agent and founder of NHL Players' Association
Naomi Campbell, Model
Myron Gottlieb, Co-founder and president of Livent
Cathy Smith, accused in the death of John Belushi
Rob Ramage, Hockey player charged with causing the death of Keith Magnuson while driving drunk
Omar Khadr, accused of war crimes (on behalf of the Criminal Lawyers' Association)
Armour Pharmaceutical Company, acquitted of providing contaminated haemophilia blood products
Andrew Rankin, Investment banker, acquitted of insider trading, convicted of stock tipping
Douglas Dunsmuir, CEO of Royal Group Technologies, acquitted of fraud
George Doodnaught, Anesthetist charged with sexual assault
Nancy  Morrison, Palliative care physician, acquitted of murder
Justin Bieber, Singer
Greg Logan, Former Mountie convicted of smuggling narwhal tusks
Marco Muzzo, convicted of killing three young children and their grandfather in a car crash while driving drunk
Thomas Baker, Lawyer and former CEO of 7-Up Canada acquitted of tax evasion
Mike DaSilva, acquitted of the murder of Canadian boxing champion Eddie Melo
Robert K. Waxman, Director of Philip Services Corp.
Boaz Manor, CEO of Portus International[36]
Philip Morris International, investigation into contraband tobacco in Canada
Bernard Sherman's family.
Abul Hasan Chowdhury, acquitted from the $1.2 Billion dollar  Padma Bridge graft scandal. 
Keith Hobbs, Mayor of Thunder Bay 
Dan Potter, CEO of Knowledge House 
Kevin O'Leary's family.
David Sharpe, disgraced former CEO of Bridging Finance Inc.
Niam Jain, renowned Autistic Artist against the Granite Club Discrimination Due To Disability

References

External links
 Greenspan Humphrey Weinstein

1947 births
Living people
Canadian Jews
Lawyers in Ontario
University of Toronto alumni
People from Niagara Falls, Ontario
Osgoode Hall Law School alumni